This is a list of Escadres (Wings) of the French Air and Space Force.

Escadres (wings) are commanded by a Lieutenant-colonel or Colonel, known as the "Chief de corps". The term Escadre replaced "regiment" in 1932. Until 1994, it meant a unit composed of several squadron-sized units (Escadron/Squadron or Groups), generally equipped with the same type of equipment, or at least the same type of mission (e.g. fighter, reconnaissance, bombing, transport) as well as wing maintenance and support units or sub-units.

Between 1993-1995, under the « Armées 2000 » reorganisation, the Escadre (wing) level of command was withdrawn from use. In 2014 it was reintroduced, with additions.

Former and active French Air Force escadrilles (squadrons) form the following former and active Escadres, as of June 14, 2015,:

Active Escadres 

The list of active Escadres as of 2018 includes:

Strategic Air Forces Command

 4th Fighter Wing, recreated on August 26, 2015 at BA113 Saint-Dizier – Robinson Air Base, operates Dassault Rafale fighters in the nuclear strike role
31st Aerial Refueling and Strategic Transport Wing, created on August 27, 2014 at BA125 Istres-Le Tubé Air Base, operates Boeing C-135FR/KC-135R Stratotanker in process of conversion to Airbus A330 MRTT

Air Forces Command

 Fighter Aviation Air Force Brigade ( (BAAC))
2nd Fighter Wing, recreated on September 3, 2015 at BA116 Luxeuil-Saint Sauveur Air Base, operates Dassault Mirage 2000-5F air defence fighters
3rd Fighter Wing, recreated on September 5, 2014 at BA133 Nancy – Ochey Air Base, operates Dassault Mirage 2000D fighter-bombers
8th Fighter Wing, recreated on August 25, 2015 at BA120 Cazaux Air Base, operates Dassault Alpha Jet in the advanced jet and tactical training roles
30th Fighter Wing, recreated on September 3, 2015 at BA118 Mont-de-Marsan Air Base, operates Dassault Rafale fighters in the tactical fighter and operational evaluation roles
 Support and Projection Air Force Brigade ( (BAAP))
61st Transport Wing, recreated on September 1, 2015 at BA123 Orléans – Bricy Air Base, operates Airbus A400M Atlas tactical transport aircraft
62nd Transport Wing, recreated on September 5, 2017 at BA123 Orléans – Bricy Air Base, operates Lockheed C/KC-130H/J Hercules tactical transport, aerial refueling and special operations aircraft
64th Transport Wing, recreated on August 27, 2015 at BA105 Évreux-Fauville Air Base, operates Aérospatiale C-160NG/Gabriel Transall tactical transport and EW aircraft
 Airspace Control Air Force Brigade ( (BACE))
36th Airborne Command and Control Wing, created on September 3, 2014 at BA702 Avord Air Base, operates Boeing E-3F Sentry AEW&C aircraft
Surface-to-Air Air Defence Wing - 1st  Anti-Aircraft Artillery Regiment, created on September 3, 2014 at BA702 Avord Air Base, operates SAMP/T in the air defence and ballistic missile defence role
Aviation Maneuver Support Air Force Brigade ( (BAAMA))
Deployable Command and Control Air Force Wing, created on August 27, 2015 at BA105 Évreux-Fauville Air Base, operates ground-based Command and control C4I systems

Former Escadres

Escadres de Bombardement/ Bombardment Escadres 

 90e Escadre de Bombardement
 91e Escadre de Bombardement
 92e Escadre de Bombardement
 93e Escadre de Bombardement
 94e Escadre de Bombardement

Escadres de Chasse/Fighter Squadron 

 1re Escadre de Chasse
 5e Escadre de Chasse
 6e Escadre de Chasse
 7e Escadre de Chasse
 9e Escadre de Chasse
 10e Escadre de Chasse
 11e Escadre de Chasse
 12e Escadre de Chasse
 13e Escadre de Chasse
 20e Escadre de Chasse
 21e Escadre de Chasse

Escadre de Missiles/ Missiles Escadres 

 95e Escadre de Missiles Stratégiques

Escadres de Reconnaissance/ Reconnaissance Escadres 

 33e Escadre de Reconnaissance

Escadres de Transport/ Transport Escadre 

 62e Escadre de Transport
 63e Escadre de Transport
 65e Escadre de Transport

Escadres d'Hélicoptères/ Helicopter Escadres 

 22e Escadre d'Hélicoptères
 23e Escadre d'Hélicoptères

See also

Major (France)
Chief of Staff of the French Air Force
Strategic Air Forces
History of the Armée de l'Air (1909–42)
History of the Armée de l'Air in the colonies (1939–62)
List of French Air and Space Force aircraft squadrons
List of French Air and Space Force bases

References

External links 
 Escadrons de chasse de l'Armée de l'air

Military units and formations of the French Air and Space Force